Harry Joseph Swacina (August 22, 1881 – June 21, 1944) was a professional baseball first baseman.

Career
He was playing for the Peoria Distillers of the Three-I League in 1907 when he was picked up by the Pittsburgh Pirates. He was inserted as the regular first baseman in mid-September, replacing the departed Jim Nealon, and batted .200 in 26 games.

In , the creation of the Federal League offered Swacina the opportunity to return to the majors. That season, he served as the regular first baseman for the Baltimore Terrapins. In , he split the first base duties for the Terrapins with Joe Agler.

When the Federal League folded after the season, Swacina again returned to the minor leagues. He continued to play professionally until , a season which he split between the Jackson Senators of the Cotton States League and the Greenville Spinners of the South Atlantic League.

Sources

Major League Baseball first basemen
Pittsburgh Pirates players
Baltimore Terrapins players
Memphis Egyptians players
Colorado Springs Millionaires players
Decatur Commodores players
Peoria Distillers players
Louisville Colonels (minor league) players
Rock Island Islanders players
Harrisburg Senators players
Mobile Sea Gulls players
Newark Indians players
New Orleans Pelicans (baseball) players
Nashville Vols players
Shreveport Gassers players
Columbia Comers players
Lakeland Highlanders players
Charleston Pals players
Augusta Tygers players
Rocky Mount Tar Heels players
Jackson Senators players
Greenville Spinners players
Minor league baseball managers
Baseball players from Alabama
Baseball players from St. Louis
1881 births
1944 deaths